The 1944 Cork Senior Football Championship was the 56th staging of the Cork Senior Football Championship since its establishment by the Cork County Board in 1887. 

Clonakilty entered the championship as the defending champions.

On 15 October 1944, Clonakilty won the championship following a 1-09 to 1-05 defeat of Fermoy in the final. This was their fourth championship title overall and their third title in succession.

Results

Finals

Championship statistics

Miscellaneous

 Clonakilty become the first side since Beara between 1932-34 to win three titles in a row.

References

Cork Senior Football Championship